Aniara is a book-length epic science fiction poem written by Swedish Nobel laureate Harry Martinson from 1953 to 1956. It narrates the tragedy of a large passenger spacecraft carrying a cargo of colonists escaping destruction on Earth veering off course, leaving the Solar System and entering into an existential struggle. The style is symbolic, sweeping and innovative for its time, with creative use of neologisms to suggest the science fictional setting. It was published in its final form on 13October 1956.

Aniara has been translated to around twenty languages. It was adapted into an opera in 1959 and a Swedish feature film in 2018.

Title
In a 1997 Swedish edition of Aniara, literary scholar Johan Wrede writes that the neologism “Aniara” is Harry Martinson's own invention. Martinson came up with the word years before writing the work while reading astronomer Arthur Eddington, then giving it the meaning as the "name for the space in which the atoms moves". A preface to a 2005 Italian edition claims that the title comes from ancient Greek ἀνιαρός, "sad, despairing", plus special resonances that the sound "a" had for Martinson. Another theory makes up the word "Aniara" from the chemical symbols Ni (Nickel) and Ar (Argon) and the negative prefix "a-", and interprets this as the ship being untethered to both earth (Nickel being abundant in the Earth's core) and sky (Argon being abundant in the Earth's atmosphere). Martinson himself is said (by Tord Hall, longtime friend) to have been fond of this interpretation.

Interpretation
According to Aadu Ott and Lars Broman at the International Planetarium Society, Aniara is an effort to "[mediate] between science and poetry, between the wish to understand and the difficulty to comprehend". Martinson translates scientific imagery into the poem: for example, the "curved space" from Albert Einstein's general theory of relativity is likely an inspiration for Martinson's description of the cosmos as "a bowl of glass", according to the Nobel Prize Foundation. Martinson also said he was influenced by Paul Dirac.

The poem 
The poem consists of 103 cantos, each relating the tragedy of a large passenger spacecraft originally bound for Mars with a cargo of colonists from the ravaged Earth. After an accident, the ship is ejected from the Solar System and into an existential struggle.

The first 29 cantos of Aniara had previously been published in Martinson's collection Cikada (1953), under the title Sången om Doris och Mima (The Song of Doris and Mima), relating the departure from Earth, the accidental near-collision with an asteroid (incidentally named Hondo, another name for the main Japanese isle where Hiroshima is situated) and ejection from the solar system, the first few years of increasing despair and distractions of the passengers, until news is received of the destruction of their home port, and perhaps of Earth itself. According to Martinson, he dictated the initial cycle as in a fever after a troubling dream, affected by the Cold War and the Soviet suppression of the 1956 Hungarian revolution; in another recounting, he said the first 29 cantos were said to be inspired by his observation of the Andromeda Galaxy.

A major theme is that of art, symbolised by the semi-mystical machinery of the Mima, who relieves the ennui of crew and passengers with scenes of far-off times and places, and whose operator is also the sometimes naïve main narrator. The rooms of Mima, according to Martinson, represent different kinds of life styles or forms of consciousness. The accumulated destruction the Mima witnesses impels her to destroy herself in despair, to which she, the machine, is finally moved by the white tears of the granite melted by the phototurb which annihilates their home port, the great city of Dorisburg. Without the succour of the Mima, the erstwhile colonists seek distraction in sensual orgies, memories of their own and earlier lives, low comedy, religious cults, observations of strange astronomical phenomena, empty entertainments, science, routine tasks, brutal totalitarianism, and in all kinds of human endeavour, but ultimately cannot face the emptiness outside and inside.

The poems are metrical and mostly rhymed, using both traditional and individual forms, several alluding to a wide range of Swedish and Nordic poetry, such as the Finnish Kalevala.

Translations 
Aniara has been translated to around twenty languages including French, German, Italian, Danish, Finnish, Norwegian, Czech, Russian, Spanish, Japanese, Chinese, Arabic, Hebrew and Esperanto.

English translations 
Aniara was translated into English as Aniara, A Review of Man in Time and Space by Hugh MacDiarmid and E. Harley Schubert in 1963. It was translated again into English by Stephen Klass and Leif Sjöberg for a 1999 edition.

Geoffrey O'Brien, writing for the New York Review of Books, compares the two editions and finds the recent Klass Sjöberg edition more faithful to "Martinson's formal schemes" while considering the MacDiarmid Schubert edition "more persuasive" as English poetry. Burns Singer wrote of the original translation "it may well prove a seminal volume in the history of English letters" in Times Literary Supplement.

Reception 
The publication of Aniara in October 1956 was met with much public interest and was enthusiastically received by many Swedish literary critics and readers. Reviewing it in Expressen in 1956, Bo Strömstedt wrote: "it is a fabulous story, and Harry Martinson tells it with an ingenuity – in substance and in words – that is also quite fabulous; even though most of the songs are written in the same iambic verse, the book never becomes monotonous." "Harry Martinson has not only written a breathtakingly lyrical science fiction story; he has also (...) created a gigantic "Paradise lost", an epic about how human greatness is turned into humiliation and powerlessness".

The well-known American science fiction writer, Theodore Sturgeon, in reviewing a 1964 American edition for a genre audience, stated that "Martinson's achievement here is an inexpressible, immeasurable sadness. [It] [t]ranscends panic and terror and even despair [and] leaves you in the quiet immensities, with the feeling that you have spent time, and have been permanently tinted, by and with an impersonal larger-than-God force."

Writing a guest review for The New York Times, D. Bruce Lockerbie suggested that with Aniara Martinson had, along with C. S. Lewis, "found that an interplanetary setting, light years removed from mundanity" supplied "the esthetic distance necessary for truly profound thought."

The poem has also been reviewed more recently. In a 2015 review, James Nicoll writes "Martinson’s creative approach to astronomy and related matters gives the work an misleadingly archaic feel." M. A. Orthofer finds in 2018, the poem "a product of its times, but even as aspects may no longer seems as current, it holds up well in its bleak vision." In his 2019 overview of Martinson's works in the New York Review of Books, Geoffrey O'Brien concludes "Aniara is an epic of extinction, conceived at a moment when extinction had begun to seem not only possible but perhaps imminent."

Legacy 
Aniara has had an influence on later works of science fiction, such as Tau Zero by Danish-American writer,  Poul Anderson, and A Fire Upon The Deep by Vernor Vinge.

In the 2004 centennial celebration of the birth of Harry Martinson, the Martinson Society characterized Aniara as an "epic poem about the spaceship in which we flee the destruction of the earth, the spaceship that drifts off course into an endless universe", and considered the poem to have achieved becoming a legend in their own right, one of the myths people are familiar with without necessarily knowing who created them.

In December 2019, the extrasolar planet HD 102956 b was named after a character aboard the spacecraft, the pilot Isagel, as part of the IAU NameExoWorlds project. The exoplanet's star was named Aniara.

Adaptations 
An opera by Karl-Birger Blomdahl also called Aniara premiered in 1959 with a libretto by Erik Lindegren based on Martinson's poem; it was staged in Stockholm, Hamburg, Brussels and Darmstadt, and later in Gothenburg and Malmö. A performance by the Royal Opera, Stockholm at the Edinburgh International Festival was broadcast on the BBC Third Programme in Sept 1959.

Aniara (1960), a Swedish TV film directed by Arne Arnbom, written by Erik Lindegren and Harry Martinson, and starring Margareta Hallin, Elisabeth Söderström, Erik Sædén and Arne Tyrén. The music was composed by Karl-Birger Blomdahl.

The BBC Third Programme broadcast an English translation, read over five nights, in November 1962.

In Martinsons home country of Sweden, Aniara has commonly been used as the basis of planetarium shows, the first one set up in 1988 by Björn Stenholm using music by Dmitrij Shostakovich in the planetarium then housed in what is now the Old Observatory in Lund, Sweden. An English-language show premiered during the International Planetarium Society conference in Salt Lake City, Utah in 1992.

Tommy Körberg headlined 31 songs from Aniara, a stage concert first set up in Olofström, Sweden in 1997.

The fourth album from the Swedish progressive metal band Seventh Wonder called The Great Escape (2010) is based on Aniara, the title track last 30:21 minutes and relates all the poem from beginning to end.

Swedish musician Kleerup released an album based on Aniara in 2012.

A melding of Aniara and Beethoven's opera Fidelio was staged by the Opéra de Lyon under the direction of American artist Gary Hill in 2013.

Aniara, a 2018 Swedish feature film by directors Pella Kågerman and Hugo Lilja, starring Emelie Jonsson, premiered at the Toronto International Film Festival that year. Also in 2018, artist Fia Backstrom made the installation  A Vaudeville on Mankind in Time and Space, using Aniara as its point of origin.

Aniara: Fragments of Time and Space, a choral theatre work with The Crossing, Helsinki’s Klockriketeatern, and composer Robert Maggio was performed in 2019."

External links 
 Text of Klass Sjöberg 1999 edition

References 

Swedish poems
Science fiction books
1956 poems
A
Works by Harry Martinson
Poems adapted into films
Existentialist works
Epic poems